Istok Rodeš (born 27 January 1996) is a Croatian alpine ski racer. Rodeš races in all alpine disciplines, however competes only in slalom and combined on a World Cup level. He competed at the 2015 World Championships in Beaver Creek, USA, in the Super-G, Downhill and the Combined.

World Cup results

Season standings

Results per discipline

Standings through 26 February 2023

World Championships results

References

External links
 
 Istok Rodeš World Cup standings at the International Ski Federation
 
 

1996 births
Croatian male alpine skiers
Living people
Alpine skiers at the 2018 Winter Olympics
Olympic alpine skiers of Croatia
Sportspeople from Varaždin
Alpine skiers at the 2012 Winter Youth Olympics